Nikolay Aleksandrovich Annenkov (Kalugino, Tambov Governorate – 30 September 1999, Moscow) was the longest-lived People's Artist of the USSR before Igor Moiseyev and Vladimir Zeldin.

He worked in the Maly Theatre from 1924 until his centenary and was awarded three Stalin Prizes. Annenkov celebrated his 100th birthday playing on stage but died only 10 days later.

He acted in the 1955 film The First Echelon.

Honours and awards
 Honored Artist of the RSFSR (1937)
 People's Artist of the RSFSR (1949)
 Stalin Prizes:
2nd class (1947) - for his role of Lieutenant-Maximov in the play "For those who are in the sea!" BA Lavrenev
1st class (1948) - for his role Lavrov in the play "The great strength of" BS Romashova
1st class (1949) - for his role Alexei Dobrotvor in the movie "The Court of Honour" (1948)
 People's Artist of the USSR (1960)
 Hero of Socialist Labour (1990)
 Four Orders of Lenin
 Order of the October Revolution
 Order of the Red Banner of Labour
 Order of Friendship of Peoples
 Order of the Badge of Honour
 Order "For Merit to the Fatherland"; 2nd and 3rd classes
 Jubilee Medal "In Commemoration of the 100th Anniversary of the Birth of Vladimir Ilyich Lenin"
Medal "For Battle Merit"
 Medal "For the Defence of Moscow"
 Medal "For the Victory over Germany in the Great Patriotic War 1941–1945"
 Medal "For Valiant Labour in the Great Patriotic War 1941–1945"
 Medal "Veteran of Labour"
 Jubilee Medal "Twenty Years of Victory in the Great Patriotic War 1941–1945"
 Jubilee Medal "Thirty Years of Victory in the Great Patriotic War 1941–1945"
 Jubilee Medal "Forty Years of Victory in the Great Patriotic War 1941–1945"
 Jubilee Medal "50 Years of the Armed Forces of the USSR"
 Jubilee Medal "60 Years of the Armed Forces of the USSR"
 Jubilee Medal "70 Years of the Armed Forces of the USSR"

See also
 List of centenarians (actors, filmmakers and entertainers)

References
 Annenkov.ru
 Biography

1899 births
1999 deaths
20th-century Russian male actors
People from Inzhavinsky District
People from Kirsanovsky Uyezd
Communist Party of the Soviet Union members
Heroes of Socialist Labour
Honored Artists of the RSFSR
People's Artists of the RSFSR
People's Artists of the USSR
Stalin Prize winners
Recipients of the Order "For Merit to the Fatherland", 2nd class
Recipients of the Order "For Merit to the Fatherland", 3rd class
Recipients of the Order of Friendship of Peoples
Recipients of the Order of Lenin
Recipients of the Order of the Red Banner of Labour
Men centenarians
Russian centenarians
Russian drama teachers
Russian male film actors
Russian male stage actors
Soviet drama teachers
Soviet male film actors
Soviet male stage actors
Burials at Vvedenskoye Cemetery